Richard Fred Suhrheinrich (born August 15, 1936) is a Senior United States circuit judge of the United States Court of Appeals for the Sixth Circuit serving in Lansing, Michigan He had been a United States district judge of the United States District Court for the Eastern District of Michigan.

Education and career

Born in Lincoln City, Indiana, Suhrheinrich earned his Bachelor of Science degree in 1960 from Wayne State University, his Juris Doctor with honors in 1963 from the Detroit College of Law (now Michigan State University College of Law) and his Master of Laws in 1990 from the University of Virginia School of Law. Suhrheinrich was an assistant prosecutor for Macomb County, Michigan in 1967 and was an associate professor of law at the Detroit College of Law from 1975-85. He co-founded, with Richard Kitch, the law firm Kitch & Suhrheinrich. The firm originally specialized in medical malpractice defense. Now the Kitch firm, the firm has since grown into a full-service law firm with seven offices throughout Michigan, Ohio, and Illinois.

Currently, Suhrheinrich is a Distinguished Jurist & Professor at the Western Michigan University Cooley Law School teaching various legal courses.

Federal judicial service

Suhrheinrich was nominated by President Ronald Reagan on September 6, 1984, to a seat on the United States District Court for the Eastern District of Michigan vacated by Judge R. James Harvey. He was confirmed by the United States Senate on October 3, 1984, and received commission on October 4, 1984. His service terminated on July 13, 1990, due to elevation to the Sixth Circuit. He was succeeded by Judge Nancy Garlock Edmunds.

Suhrheinrich was nominated by President George H. W. Bush on April 18, 1990, to a seat on the United States Court of Appeals for the Sixth Circuit vacated by Judge Albert J. Engel Jr. He was confirmed by the Senate on June 28, 1990, and received commission on July 10, 1990. He assumed senior status on August 15, 2001 and was succeeded by Judge David McKeague.

Notable case

He made national news on December 22, 2005, when he authored ACLU v. Mercer County, in which an appeals panel of the Sixth Circuit unanimously upheld the continued display of the Ten Commandments in a Kentucky courthouse.

In his opinion, Suhrheinrich stated that the United States Constitution does not demand "a wall of separation between church and state," denying a claim by the ACLU. In addition, he criticized the ACLU's "repeated references to the 'separation of church and state'", stating that "this extra-constitutional construct has grown tiresome." Judge Alice M. Batchelder joined in the opinion, while District Judge Walter Herbert Rice merely concurred in the decision but not the opinion.

References

External links 

1936 births
20th-century American judges
20th-century American lawyers
American prosecutors
Detroit College of Law alumni
Detroit College of Law faculty
Indiana lawyers
Judges of the United States Court of Appeals for the Sixth Circuit
Judges of the United States District Court for the Eastern District of Michigan
Living people
People from Spencer County, Indiana
United States court of appeals judges appointed by George H. W. Bush
United States district court judges appointed by Ronald Reagan
University of Virginia School of Law alumni
Wayne State University alumni